A rope chain is a metal chain necklace consisting of several small links which pattern the shape of a rope.

The style is immensely popular throughout the world.

The rope chain is popular within the Hip hop community and was popularized by Golden age rap groups, Run D.M.C. as well as Eric B. & Rakim.

Chains
Types of jewellery